Sigizan was a Hun general in the Byzantine army.

He was a commander of the Hun auxiliaries in the Byzantine Empire, fighting alongside fellow Hun commander Zolban. He fought against the Isaurians in 493 AD.

His name might be of Germanic origin.

References

Hun military leaders
5th-century Byzantine military personnel
Byzantine people of Hunnic descent